John Steelman may refer to:
 John R. Steelman, first person to serve as the assistant to the President of the United States
 John Hansson Steelman, fur trader and interpreter